Franco Nicolazzi (10 April 1924 – 22 January 2015) was an Italian politician.

Nicolazzi was born in Gattico, in the province of Novara. During World War II he fought against the German occupation of Italy with the Brigate Matteotti. He was one of the founders of the Italian Democratic Socialist Party (Partito Socialista Democratico Italiano, PSDI) in 1948, an offshoot of the Italian Socialist Party whose members were against the decision to ally with the Italian Communist Party.

Nicolazzi was a member of the Italian Parliament from 1963 to 1992; he served also as Minister of Industry in 1979 and then as Minister of Public Works from 1979 to 1987. He retired from political activity after his encroachment in the Tangentopoli scandal, in which he was condemned to a one-year residence order.

From 2006 until his death he was the President of the Giuseppe Saragat Foundation.

Nicolazzi died on 22 January 2015, aged 90.

References

1924 births
2015 deaths
People from the Province of Novara
Italian Democratic Socialist Party politicians
Deputies of Legislature IV of Italy
Deputies of Legislature V of Italy
Deputies of Legislature VI of Italy
Deputies of Legislature VII of Italy
Deputies of Legislature VIII of Italy
Deputies of Legislature IX of Italy
Deputies of Legislature X of Italy
Politicians of Piedmont
Italian military personnel of World War II